This is a list of properties and districts in Jones County, Georgia that are listed on the National Register of Historic Places (NRHP).

Current listings

|}

References

Jones
Buildings and structures in Jones County, Georgia